Ritva Järvinen (born 2 August 1932) is a Finnish former freestyle swimmer. She competed in three events at the 1952 Summer Olympics.

References

External links
 

1932 births
Living people
Finnish female freestyle swimmers
Olympic swimmers of Finland
Swimmers at the 1952 Summer Olympics
Swimmers from Helsinki